Sheryl Berk  is an American writer. She is the co-author of the New York Times Bestseller Soul Surfer as well as other celebrity biographies. She is the author of the children's book series Dance Divas. She also co-authored three children's and young adult novel series: The Cupcake Club, Fashion Academy, and Ask Emma, along with her daughter Carrie Berk.

Berk has co-written eight bestsellers and also served as an editor for publications such as McCall's and Life & Style Magazine.

Life and career

Berk was born Sheryl Kahn and graduated from Syracuse University. Early in her career, she worked as the entertainment editor for McCall's She also served as the editor-in-chief for Life & Style Magazine when it was launched in 2004.

Berk is a writer and co-author of several celebrity biographies, including eight bestsellers, including Heart to Heart, Wise Girl: What I've Learned About Life, Love, and Loss, and The Rules According to JWOWW. She is the co-author of the 2004 best-selling book Soul Surfer, co-written with Bethany Hamilton and later turned into the 2011 film of the same name.

Berk co-authored three children's and young adult novel series with her daughter Carrie Berk. The first series, The Cupcake Club, started as a two page story written by Carrie that Berk showed to her agent. The series was picked up by Sourcebooks and included a total of 12 books. The first book in the series, Peace, Love & Cupcakes, inspired an off-Broadway musical of the same name. She also co-authored the series Fashion Academy and Ask Emma along with Carrie. Berk is also the author of the Dance Divas series which inspired the off-Broadway musical Dance Divas Nutcracker. She also authored several children's books based on Disney animated films.

Bibliography

Book series

Dance Divas

The Cupcake Club

Fashion Academy

Ask Emma

References

External links
Official website

Year of birth missing (living people)
Syracuse University alumni
American writers
Living people